The Children's Farm Home School is a former school building on U.S. Route 20 in Oregon between Corvallis and Albany; it is located on a  campus now owned by Trillium Family Services.

The Children's Farm Home School was listed in 2008 on the National Register of Historic Places for Benton County; the listing was one of the first steps taken as part of a restoration effort that ended up taking five years.

History
The  Children's Farm Home School was built in 1925 by volunteers from among the local Woman's Christian Temperance Union membership, for the purpose of providing homes for orphans, neglected children, and children whose families could not otherwise take care of them in the years leading up to the Great Depression.  Its pupils would go on to attend Corvallis High School. It supported itself through proceeds from a cannery, dairy and slaughterhouse, as well as the sale of produce and nuts, grown on the property.

The school closed in the 1980s. In 1998, Children's Farm Home School merged with the Parry Center for Children and Waverly Children's Home (aka Waverly Baby Home) in Portland to form Trillium Family Services.

Restoration
Restoration efforts began in 2008, after $4.5 million was raised from donors including Dave and Penny Lowther of Philomath.  Bill Ryals of Modern Organic Architecture in Corvallis designed the improvements, assisted by Endex Engineering.  T. Gerding Construction Co. were the general contractors, helped by volunteers.  In 2011, an "unanticipated septic system upgrade" required Trillium Family Services to raise another million dollars.

In July 2013, Children's Farm Home School reopened, with a basement converted to a family center and rooms where families can spend time together. A restaurant was also opened on the first floor.  Classrooms have become conference rooms available to rent.  The renovation also features a banquet room, administrative offices, and a museum.

References

External links

1925 establishments in Oregon
Colonial Revival architecture in Oregon
Georgian Revival architecture in Oregon
National Register of Historic Places in Benton County, Oregon
School buildings completed in 1925
School buildings on the National Register of Historic Places in Oregon